Henry Albert Wilson  (6 September 1876 – 16 July 1961) was an Anglican bishop and author.

Biography
Born in Port Bannatyne, Wilson was educated at Camberwell Grammar School and Corpus Christi College, Cambridge.

Wilson was made a deacon in Advent 1899 (on St Thomas' Day, 21 December) by Mandell Creighton, Bishop of London, at Holy Trinity, Chelsea; and ordained a priest the next Advent (23 December 1900) by Alfred Barry, assistant bishop for West London, at St Paul's Cathedral. He began his career with a curacy at Christ Church, Hampstead, in London; after which he became Vicar of Norbiton. He was then Rural Dean of Cheltenham, until his appointment to the episcopate in 1929 as the third Bishop of Chelmsford.

He was consecrated a bishop on the Feast of the Conversion of St Paul, 25 January 1929, by Arthur Winnington-Ingram, Bishop of London, at Westminster Abbey. (He had recently taken his See by the confirmation of his election, after his predecessor had translated on 21 January, but before his own consecration on 25 January.) A proposal to expedite divorce – by having divorce cases heard in a magistrates' court rather than a higher court – prompted his strenuous objection in 1944: "the landslide in sexual morals" meant that Christianity was "hanging by a thread in this country today". He resigned effective 30 November 1950, and retired to Southwold. He had become a Doctor of Divinity (DD).

Wilson's son was the architect Colin St John Wilson.

Works
 Episcopacy and Unity, 1912
 The Master and His Friends, 1925
 Your Faith or Your Life, 1940
 Reflections of a Back-Bench Bishop, 1948

References

1876 births
Alumni of Corpus Christi College, Cambridge
Commanders of the Order of the British Empire
Bishops of Chelmsford
1961 deaths
20th-century Church of England bishops